Little Bighorn may refer to:
 Little Bighorn River, (previously called Little Big Horn River) a tributary of the Bighorn River in Wyoming and Montana
 Battle of the Little Bighorn, took place near the river in 1876
 Little Bighorn Battlefield National Monument, preserves the site of the 1876 battle
 Little Big Horn College, two-year tribal college of the Crow Nation in Crow Agency, Montana
 Little Big Horn (film), a 1951 Western movie starring Lloyd Bridges
 Little Big Horn (album), a 1963 jazz album by Nat Adderley